Clairvoyant is the fourth studio album by American progressive metal band The Contortionist, released on September 15, 2017 through eOne Music and Good Fight Entertainment. It has been described as somewhat of a departure from their previous heavy sound, moving the band more toward a progressive rock style.

Track listing

Personnel
The Contortionist
 Michael Lessard – vocals 
 Robby Baca – guitar 
 Cameron Maynard – guitar 
 Jordan Eberhardt – bass 
 Eric Guenther – keyboards 
 Joey Baca – drums
Production
Produced by Jamie King

Charts

References

2017 albums
The Contortionist albums
E1 Music albums
Albums produced by Jamie King (record producer)